Reginald Wilson may refer to:

Reginald Wilson (psychologist), American psychologist
Reg Wilson (born 1948), English speedway team manager and former rider 
Reg Wilson (golfer) (1888–1959), English golfer
Sir Reginald Victor Wilson (1877–1957), Australian businessman and politician